The Guildhall of St George, also known as St George’s Guildhall, is a Grade I listed building in King’s Lynn, Norfolk, England, currently in the ownership of the National Trust. At present it is leased on a long lease by the Borough Council of King's Lynn and West Norfolk for hire by the public as a space for music, performances, lectures and entertainments.

It was built for the Guild of St George, which was founded in 1376.

History of St George's Guildhall 
The historic Guildhall of St George is the largest surviving medieval guildhall in the country. The Guildhall was created for the Guild of St George at the beginning of the 15th century.

St George’s Guildhall in King’s Lynn is a Grade 1 listed building, currently in the ownership of the National Trust.  At 32.6 x 8.8 m (107 x 29 feet), it is the oldest and largest complete medieval Guildhall in England with an unrivalled history as a venue for theatrical production.  At present it is leased by the Borough Council for hire by the public as a space for music, performances, lectures and entertainments.

In 1406 the Guild of St George (which existed by 1376) acquired land reclaimed from the River Ouse to build its hall.  This was in use by 1428.  In about 1500 five buttresses had to be built against the north wall, spanning the stream alongside, because of evident instability. In the late 17th century the brick vaulted wine cellar was made in the undercroft, and access to this was continued under the later warehouses towards the river.

Following the Dissolution of the Guilds in 1547 the Guildhall became the property of Lynn Corporation, who owned it until 1814. It served as the ‘Common Hall’ [meaning Public], as well as a court house, merchants’ exchange, French school, and even an armoury and gunpowder store in the 1640s. In 1704 there was an unsuccessful attempt to open a button factory for the unemployed.

The earliest record of a theatrical production is of a nativity play before a Guild feast in January 1445 featuring William, the barber in Grassmarket, and Richard Comber. In following years the Guild staged various theatrical events and a St George’s Day procession (with Guild members’ children, a dragon and a castle on wheels) took place every year until 1546. After the Dissolution it was used by companies of Players; the Queen’s Players were here seven times between 1585 and 1595. Recent academic research has supported local tradition that Shakespeare himself played here with the Earl of Pembroke’s Men in 1593 when London theatres were closed by plague. Shakespeare’s leading comic actor, Robert Armin, was born in King’s Lynn in 1565, the family living in what is now 78 High Street.  Armin was the first Feste in Twelfth Night, Autolycus in A Winter’s Tale and the Fool in King Lear, and is credited with being a major influence on Shakespeare.

In the 17th century players continued to use the Guildhall until the Commonwealth banned such performances.  After the Restoration in 1660 various Norwich theatre companies leased it during the annual February Mart season, and continued to do so in the 18th century.

By 1766, drama at the Guildhall was so successful that the Mayor commissioned Thomas Sharpe to build a playhouse inside the Guildhall for £450, probably on the plan of the earlier, existing theatre.  (Vestiges of this remained in the 20th century from which a model was made.) In 1769 Thomas Snagg, Britain’s leading comic actor, described the town as ‘a good one for comedians’ with a ‘very pretty’ theatre. The leading tragic actor of the period, George Cooke, appeared here in 1774 and overall the theatre attracted a wide spectrum of society; the editor of the Cambridge Chronicle noted the problem of rowdy audiences, due to ‘irregular persons mixing with their superiors’.

The success of the playhouse led to the Theatre Royal being built in St James’s Street in 1813, and the Guildhall was sold in 1814 to William Lee Warner for £557.10s.  His estate was bought by the neighbouring Lynn merchant family of Everard in 1826 and the Guildhall became a warehouse. The Everards sold the hall (for £2,650) in 1920 to G.M. Bridges and Son Ltd., internationally renowned scenic artists, who were already the tenants.  G.M. Bridges held Royal Warrants for their work on outdoor theatre sets at Sandringham. 

The impact of cinema took away much of the firm’s work and by 1945 the Guildhall was not only derelict but in danger of being demolished for the expansion of a nearby garage.  The Guildhall was going to be auctioned. In order to prevent the probable demolition of this building it was purchased by Alexander Penrose, son of J. Doyle Penrose. Penrose proved to be the Guildhall’s saviour and before his death in 1950 he led a project to convert it to an Arts Centre, with funding from the Pilgrim Trust, the Arts Council and public subscription. The building was vested in the National Trust and the St George’s Arts Trust took a long lease in 1951. The centre was opened by Queen Elizabeth The Queen Mother, for the first King’s Lynn Festival on 24 July 1951.

The adjoining former warehouses to the west were converted to galleries in 1963 by Lady Fermoy (lady-in-waiting to the Queen Mother) as a memorial to her late husband, Lord Fermoy, formerly mayor of King’s Lynn and its MP. In 1993 the Borough Council took over the lease from St George’s Arts Trust, and from 1997 had responsibility for programming and operation.  Between 2011 and 2016 King’s Lynn Arts Centre Trust managed the galleries. In 2019 the National Trust, the King's Lynn and West Norfolk Borough Council and the newly formed Shakespeare’s Guildhall Trust began discussions on the way forward to preserve, expand and enhance the unique theatrical heritage of the St George’s Guildhall.  This discussion led to West Norfolk Borough Council, Norfolk Museums Service and the National Trust forming a project team to take forward the vision for the site.

Current status 
Since the closure of King's Lynn Arts Centre Trust in 2016, the Guildhall faced an uncertain future.  There was a concern it may close.  It is now the priority project of the Town Deal for King's Lynn.  

A comprehensive, holistic vision for the Guildhall and other surrounding buildings has been developed

On 5 January 2020, St George's Guildhall theatre hosted a live performance commemorating 575 years of theatre produced by Shakespeare's Guildhall Trust.

In 2022 Tim FitzHigham was made Creative Director for the site.  It is part of the Town Deal for King's Lynn.

References 

King's Lynn
National Trust properties in Norfolk
Grade I listed buildings in Norfolk